Złota 44 is a residential skyscraper (192 meters high, 52 stories) in central Warsaw, Poland. It was designed by Polish-American architect Daniel Libeskind, in association with Polish architects Architecture. It was developed by US real estate investment manager Amstar and Warsaw developer BBI Development, which bought the topped-out but unfinished building from its initial developer, ORCO.

Design

The building's name comes from its address on Złota ("Golden") Street. Złota 44 is located next to the Palace of Culture and Science, the tallest building in Poland (237 m), and the Złote Tarasy shopping center. At 192 meters, Złota 44 is the sixth-tallest skyscraper in Warsaw.

Złota 44 is one of the tallest residential buildings in Poland and the European Union. The luxury 52-story skyscraper reaches a height of 192 meters and contains 287 apartments. All of these are equipped with the home management system (HMS), facilitating control of the air conditioning, roller blinds, heating, illumination, and allowing online restaurant orders and other services. All residents receive a security card, which only allows them to reach the floor their apartment is located on.

Residents have access to a wine cellar which accommodates up to 10,000 bottles and includes a tasting room. In addition to a 25-meter swimming pool (the largest private pool in Poland), the recreational floor has a hot tub, massage rooms, a Finnish sauna, a steam room and outdoor terrace. The floor also features a private movie theater with a golf simulator, children's playroom and conference rooms. A dedicated concierge is at the disposal of residents.

Apartments 

The apartments are located between the 9th and 52nd floors. Fully finished apartments were offered in nine interior design variants and four sizes: one-bedroom units (from 62 to 70 square meters), medium-sized units (90 to 120 square meters), larger apartments (140 to 250 square meters) and penthouses (which may exceed 1000 square meters, possibly encompassing the entire floor).

On 16 April 2015, the sale of apartments officially resumed. Depending on location, size, layout and finishing standard, the price per square meter ranged from 24,000 to 40,000 PLN.

History 

Due to financial problems experienced by the developer, as well as invalidation of the construction permit and disputes with the inhabitants of the surrounding buildings, Złota 44's construction was put on hold in 2009, but resumed in January 2011. On 3 February 2012, the building was topped out.

In December 2013, ORCO terminated its contract with general construction contractor Inso. By the end of the year, ORCO was calling the investment a "major financial failure for the group in the fall of 2013". It announced a €121 million (approximately 500 million PLN) write-down of the value of the building, and went on to announce its intention to sell it as quickly as possible. One of the banks financing the skyscraper's construction terminated its contract and wanted its 250 million PLN loan refunded. ORCO also disclosed that the high apartment prices (up to 65,000 PLN per square meter, at the time the highest in Poland) were artificially inflated to generate media coverage.

On 28 August 2014, ORCO's sale of Złota 44 was finalized; the skyscraper was acquired by American real estate investment company Amstar and Polish property developer BBI Development for €50 million (approximately 215 million PLN), a fraction of the estimated €163 million (700 million PLN) construction cost.

Panorama picture

See also
 List of tallest buildings in Poland
 List of tallest buildings in Warsaw
 List of tallest buildings in Europe

References

External links

 Project website
 Project page from the architect's website

Skyscrapers in Warsaw
Śródmieście, Warsaw
Daniel Libeskind buildings
Residential skyscrapers in Poland
Buildings and structures completed in 2016